Zoran Belošević (Serbian Cyrillic: Зоран Белошевић; born 20 June 1983) is a Serbian former professional footballer who played as a defender.

Career
Born in Zaječar, Belošević started out at Timok, before moving to Romanian club Politehnica Timișoara in the 2004 winter transfer window. He returned to his homeland after spending a year abroad and joined Kosanica until the end of the 2004–05 Serbian Second League. Following two brief spells at Sevojno and OFK Niš, Belošević moved to Bosnia and Herzegovina to play for Slavija Sarajevo and Modriča. When he played with Slavija he played in the 2007 UEFA Intertoto Cup.

In 2008, Belošević briefly played for Bulgarian club Slavia Sofia, before returning to Bosnia and Herzegovina to sign with Sarajevo. He spent two years at the club, earning a transfer to Universitatea Cluj in the summer of 2010. Six months later, Belošević moved back to his previous club Sarajevo. During his tenure with Sarajevo he featured in the 2009–10 UEFA Europa League, 2011–12 UEFA Champions League, and the 2012–13 UEFA Europa League.

In the 2013 winter transfer window, Belošević signed with Greek Football League club Pierikos. He subsequently won the Premier League of Bosnia and Herzegovina with Zrinjski Mostar in the 2013–14 season. After returning to his native Serbia, Belošević played for Napredak Kruševac and Radnik Surdulica, helping the latter side win the 2014–15 Serbian First League.

In 2015, Belošević went overseas to play in the Canadian Soccer League with Milton SC, and later was transferred to London City midway through the season.

Honours
Zrinjski Mostar
 Premier League of Bosnia and Herzegovina: 2013–14
Radnik Surdulica
 Serbian First League: 2014–15

References

External links
 
 
 
 
 

Association football defenders
First Professional Football League (Bulgaria) players
Canadian Soccer League (1998–present) players
Expatriate footballers in Bosnia and Herzegovina
Expatriate footballers in Bulgaria
Expatriate footballers in Greece
Expatriate footballers in Romania
Expatriate soccer players in Canada
FC Politehnica Timișoara players
FC Universitatea Cluj players
FK Modriča players
FK Napredak Kruševac players
FK Radnik Surdulica players
FK Sarajevo players
FK Sevojno players
FK Slavija Sarajevo players
FK Timok players
Football League (Greece) players
HŠK Zrinjski Mostar players
Liga I players
London City players
Milton SC players
OFK Niš players
People from Zaječar
PFC Slavia Sofia players
Pierikos F.C. players
Premier League of Bosnia and Herzegovina players
Serbian expatriate footballers
Serbian expatriate sportspeople in Bosnia and Herzegovina
Serbian expatriate sportspeople in Bulgaria
Serbian expatriate sportspeople in Canada
Serbian expatriate sportspeople in Greece
Serbian expatriate sportspeople in Romania
Serbian First League players
Serbian footballers
Serbian SuperLiga players
1983 births
Living people